Foday Manneh (born 14 January 2000) is a Gambian footballer who plays as a forward for Vejle Boldklub.

Career
In 2018, Manneh signed for Danish second division side Vejle Boldklub, where he scored 6 goals on debut during a 6-0 cup win over Allesø GF.

Before the 2019 season, he was sent on loan to HIFK in the Finnish top flight.

Before the 2020 season, he was sent on loan to Finnish second division club MYPA.

References

External links
 

Living people
2000 births
Gambian footballers
Association football forwards
HIFK Fotboll players
Myllykosken Pallo −47 players
Vejle Boldklub players
Veikkausliiga players
Ykkönen players
Danish 1st Division players
Gambian expatriate footballers
Expatriate footballers in Finland
Gambian expatriate sportspeople in Finland
Expatriate men's footballers in Denmark
Gambian expatriate sportspeople in Denmark